Broers or alternatively Die Broers is a South African music group trio made up of Snyman brother Christo, Cobus and Stephan and formed in 2006. Broers (meaning Brothers in Afrikaans) had a big hit with "Huistoe" (meaning Home in Afrikaans) in 2008 for which they won "Best Song of the Year" in the Tempo Awards given annually by Huisgenoot popular Afrikaans magazine in South Africa. Their live DVD Broers Tussen die Sterre (meaning Brothers Between the Stars) was nominated for the category "Best DVD of the Year". The band has its own publishing company SMP (Snyman-musiekproduksies).

Christo en Cobus 
Prior to Broers, the older brothers had worked independently as a duo under the name Christo en Cobus starting 1992. The last release as a duo was in 2007 after which they concentrated on the Broers with four studio albums including a gospel album.

Nic Stevens
Meanwhile, the youngest brother Stephan Snyman had been developing a music career on his own using the name Nic Stevens. Stephan is also a multi-instrumentalist playing the piano, guitar and the trumpet. He has three albums to his name including a full album of cover of Bryan Adams songs.

Discography

Christo en Cobus
Studio albums
1993: Prince of Romance (SMP)
1995: Somernag - Sterrenag (Mac Villa)
1997: Kyk Hoe Lyk Ons Nou (BMG/ Mac Villa)
1998: Dancing to The Beat of Our Music (BMG/ Mac Villa)
2000: Nuwe Winde (Maroela Musiek)
2002: Trein Na Margate (SMP)
2007: 7x70 (SMP)
2011: 20 Partytjie Treffers  (SMP)

Compilation albums
2000: Tiekiedraai deur die eeu (2 CDs) (BMG/ Mac Villa)

Christo Snyman
Studio albums
2003: 3 Chord Love Songs (SMP)

Cobus Snyman
Studio albums
2003: Live, Laugh, Love Country (SMP)
2013: Cowboys & Crooks (SMP)

Nic Stevens
Studio albums
2004: Jonk Bly (SMP)
2007: Toeter Skoeter (SMP)
2011: Sing Die Musiek Van Bryan Adams (SMP)

Broers

Studio albums
2006: Broers (SMP)
2009: 10 000 Myl (SMP)
2011: Voetspore (SMP) (gospel album)
2013: Voetspore 2 (SMP) (gospel album)

Live albums
2010: Grootste Treffers Live   (SMP)

DVDs
2006: Tussen Die Sterre (SMP / Select Music)
2010: 10 000 Myl DVD (SMP / Select Music)
2012: Voetspore (SMP) (a gospel DVD)

References

South African musical groups
Sibling musical trios